Calosoma glaciale is a species of ground beetle in the subfamily of Carabinae. It was described by Kolbe in 1905.

References

glaciale
Beetles described in 1905